Żarów  is a town in Świdnica County, Lower Silesian Voivodeship, in south-western Poland. 

It is the seat of the administrative district (gmina) called Gmina Żarów.

As of 2020, the town has a population of 12,335. 53.9% of the population is classified as urban, while 46.1% is classified as rural.

Notable people
 Klaus von Beyme (1934-2021), political scientist
 Wilhelm Vorwerg (1899–1990), artist

See also
 See twin towns of Gmina Żarów.

References

Cities and towns in Lower Silesian Voivodeship
Świdnica County